In My Own Dream is a 1968 album by The Butterfield Blues Band. It continued the trend of its predecessor The Resurrection of Pigboy Crabshaw in moving towards a more soul-oriented sound, supported by a first rate horn section, (featuring a young David Sanborn), but was not so well-received either by critics or the public as its predecessor.

The title cut features a long solo by Sanborn on soprano saxophone. The drums were handled by Philip Wilson, who went on to jazz renown in the Art Ensemble of Chicago. The LP includes three songs written by bassist Bugsy Maugh, two of which he sings lead on. This album is also notable as the last Butterfield record with original members Mark Naftalin and Elvin Bishop, who both moved on to solo ventures of varying success.

Track listing 
 "Last Hope's Gone" (Paul Butterfield, Jim Hayne, David Sanborn) - 4:52
 "Mine to Love" (Bugsy Maugh) - 4:21
 "Get Yourself Together" (Bugsy Maugh) - 4:10
 "Just to Be With You" (Bernie Roth) - 6:12
 "Morning Blues" (Bugsy Maugh) - 4:58
 "Drunk Again" (Elvin Bishop) - 6:08
 "In My Own Dream" (Paul Butterfield) - 5:48

Personnel
The Butterfield Blues Band
 Paul Butterfield – vocals, harmonica, guitar ("In My Own Dream")
 Elvin Bishop – guitar, vocals ("Drunk Again")
 Mark Naftalin (credited as "Naffy Markham") – keyboards
 Bugsy Maugh – bass, vocals ("Mine To Love", "Morning Blues" and "Get Yourself Together") 
 Phil Wilson – drums, conga 
with:
 Gene Dinwiddie - tenor saxophone, flute, tambourine, mandolin ("In My Own Dream")
 David Sanborn - soprano saxophone, alto saxophone, baritone saxophone
 Keith Johnson - trumpet, piano ("Drunk Again")
 Al Kooper - organ ("Drunk Again" and "Just To Be With You")
 "The Icebag Four" (Bugsy Maugh, Gene Dinwiddie, Phil Wilson, John Court) - backing vocals
Technical
William S. Harvey - art direction
Gene Szafran - artwork

Charts
Billboard (North America)

References

1968 albums
Paul Butterfield Blues Band albums
Elektra Records albums